Modestas Bukauskas (born February 10, 1994) is a Lithuanian-British mixed martial artist who competes in the Light Heavyweight division of the Ultimate Fighting Championship (UFC). He is the former Cage Warriors Light Heavyweight Champion.

Mixed martial arts career

Early career

Bukauskas, a 4-time British Kickboxing Champion compiled a 10–2 record on the UK MMA scene, fighting mostly for the Cage Warriors promotion, where he won the Cage Warriors Light Heavyweight Championship by knocking out 7-time Norwegian national wrestling champion Marthin Hamlet in the fourth round at Cage Warriors 106. He then went on to defend his title at Cage Warriors 111 against Riccardo Nosiglia by knocking Nosiglia out with elbows to the head after Nosiglia tried for a takedown.

Ultimate Fighting Championship

Bukauskas was scheduled to face Vinicius Moreira at UFC on ESPN: Kattar vs. Ige on July 16, 2020. However, Moreira tested positive for COVID-19 on July 3 and was removed from the event. Moreira was replaced by Andreas Michailidis. He won the bout via TKO after Michailidis couldn't get up at the end of the round due to a series of elbows to the side of the head. Bukauskas in the process became the first Lithuanian to win in the UFC.
This win earned him the Performance of the Night award.

Bukauskas faced Jimmy Crute on 18 October 2020 at UFC Fight Night: Ortega vs. The Korean Zombie. He lost the fight via knockout in round one.

Bukauskas faced Michał Oleksiejczuk on March 27, 2021, at UFC 260. He lost a close bout via split decision.

Bukauskas faced Khalil Rountree Jr. on September 4, 2021, at UFC Fight Night 191. He lost the fight via technical knockout in round two after Rountree side kicked his front leg causing an injury.

On October 20, 2021, it was announced that Bukauskas was no longer on the UFC roster.

Post UFC 
In his first performance post UFC release, Bukauskas returned from a year layoff due to a knee surgery to defeat Lee Chadwick via unanimous decision on November 4, 2022, at Cage Warriors 145.

Bukauskas faced Chuck Campbell for the vacant Cage Warriors Light Heavyweight Championship on December 31, 2022, at Cage Warriors 148, knocking him out in the fourth round to regain the title.

Return to UFC 
Bukauskas faced Tyson Pedro, replacing Zhang Mingyang, on February 12, 2023, at UFC 284. He won the fight via unanimous decision.

Championships and achievements

Mixed martial arts
Cage Warriors 
 Cage Warriors Light Heavyweight Championship (Two Time) 
One successful defense 
 Ultimate Fighting Championship
Performance of the Night (One time)

Mixed martial arts record

|-
|Win
|align=center|14–5
|Tyson Pedro
|Decision (unanimous)
|UFC 284
|
|align=center|3
|align=center|5:00
|Perth, Australia 
|
|-
|Win
|align=center|13–5
|Chuck Campbell 
|KO (punch)
|Cage Warriors 148
|
|align=center|4
|align=center|0:22
|London, England
|
|-
|Win
|align=center|12–5
|Lee Chadwick
|Decision (unanimous)
|Cage Warriors 145
|
|align=center|3
|align=center|5:00
|London, England
|
|-
|Loss
|align=center|11–5
|Khalil Rountree Jr.
|TKO (leg kick)
|UFC Fight Night: Brunson vs. Till 
|
|align=center|2
|align=center|2:30
|Las Vegas, Nevada, United States
|
|-
|Loss
|align=center|11–4
|Michał Oleksiejczuk
|Decision (split)
|UFC 260 
|
|align=center|3
|align=center|5:00
|Las Vegas, Nevada, United States
|
|-
| Loss
| align=center| 11–3
| Jimmy Crute
|KO (punches)
|UFC Fight Night: Ortega vs. The Korean Zombie 
|
|align=center|1
|align=center|2:01
|Abu Dhabi, United Arab Emirates
| 
|-
| Win
| align=center| 11–2
| Andreas Michailidis
| TKO (elbows)
|UFC on ESPN: Kattar vs. Ige 
|
|align=center|1
|align=center|5:00
|Abu Dhabi, United Arab Emirates
| 
|-
| Win
| align=center| 10–2
| Riccardo Nosiglia
| KO (elbows)
| Cage Warriors 111
| 
| align=center| 1
| align=center| 3:51
| London, England
| 
|-
| Win
| align=center| 9–2
| Marthin Hamlet
| TKO (punches)
| Cage Warriors 106: Night of Champions
| 
| align=center| 4
| align=center| 3:56
| London, England
| 
|-
| Win
| align=center| 8–2
| Marcin Wójcik
| TKO (punches)
| Cage Warriors 102
| 
| align=center| 2
| align=center| 4:09
| London, England
|
|-
| Win
| align=center| 7–2
| Dan Konecke
| TKO
| FightStar Championship 16
| 
| align=center| 1
| align=center| 2:30
| London, England
|
|-
| Win
| align=center|6–2
| Kristian Lapsley
| Technical Submission (rear-naked choke)
| Cage Warriors 93
| 
| align=center|1
| align=center|2:39
| Gothenburg, Sweden
|
|-
| Win
| align=center| 5–2
| Pelu Adetola
| Submission (rear-naked choke)
| Cage Warriors 92: Super Saturday
| 
|align=Center|1
|align=center|4:10
| London, England
| 
|-
| Loss
| align=center| 4–2
| John Redmond
| TKO (punches)
| Cage Warriors Fighting Championship 77
|
|align=Center|1
|align=center|1:12
|London, England
| 
|-
| Loss
| align=center| 4–1
| Pavel Doroftei
| Submission (leg lock)
| Ultimate Challenge MMA 47
| 
| align=center| 1
| align=center| 0:18
| London, England
| 
|-
| Win
| align=center| 4–0
| Dave Rintoul
| TKO (punches)
| Too Much Talent: Fight Night 6
| 
| align=center| 1
| align=center| 4:17
| Chertsey, England
| 
|-
| Win
| align=center| 3–0
| Kes Mamba
| TKO (punches)
| Ultimate Challenge MMA 45
| 
| align=center| 2
| align=center| 1:03
| London, England
| 
|-
| Win
| align=center| 2–0
| Nelson Lima
| TKO (punches)
| Ultimate Challenge MMA 44
| 
| align=center| 2
| align=center| 2:14
| London, England
|
|-
| Win
| align=center| 1–0
| Arvydas Juska
| Decision (unanimous)
| Ultimate Challenge MMA 43
| 
| align=center| 3
| align=center| 5:00
| London, England
|

See also 
 List of current UFC fighters
 List of male mixed martial artists

References

External links 
  
 

1994 births
Living people
Sportspeople from Klaipėda
Lithuanian male mixed martial artists
English male mixed martial artists
Light heavyweight mixed martial artists
Mixed martial artists utilizing kickboxing
Ultimate Fighting Championship male fighters
Lithuanian male kickboxers
English male kickboxers
English people of Lithuanian descent